Kepler-84 is a Sun-like star 4,700 light-years from the Sun. It is a G-type star. The stellar radius measurement has a large uncertainty of 48% as in 2017, complicating the modelling of the star. The Kepler-84 star has two suspected stellar companions. Four red dwarfs are few arcseconds away and at least one is probably gravitationally bound to Kepler-84. Another (which is a background star with a probability 0.5%) is a yellow star of mass 0.855 on projected separations of 0.18″ or 0.26″ (213.6 AU).

Planetary system
Kepler-84 is orbited by five known planets, four small gas giants and a Super-Earth. Planets Kepler-84b and Kepler-84c were confirmed in 2012 while the rest was confirmed in 2014. To keep the known planetary system stable, no additional giant planets can be located within 7.4 AU from the parent stars.

References
 

1589
G-type main-sequence stars
Solar analogs
Planetary systems with five confirmed planets

Cygnus (constellation)
J19530049+4029458
Planetary transit variables